The 2022 Hamilton Tiger-Cats season was the 64th season for the team in the Canadian Football League and their 72nd overall. The Tiger-Cats qualified for the playoffs for the fourth consecutive year in Week 20 following a win over the Ottawa Redblacks and a loss by the Saskatchewan Roughriders. However, the team lost in the East Semi-Final to the Montreal Alouettes.

The 2022 season was the third season under head coach Orlondo Steinauer and the first with Steinauer leading the personnel department as the president of football operations.

Offseason

Players added

Players lost

CFL Global Draft
The 2022 CFL Global Draft took place on May 3, 2022. With the format being a snake draft, the Tiger-Cats selected ninth in the odd-numbered rounds and first in the even-numbered rounds.

CFL National Draft
The 2022 CFL Draft took place on May 3, 2022. The Tiger-Cats were scheduled to have the eighth selection in each of the eight rounds of the draft after finishing as the Grey Cup runner-up in the previous season. However, the team traded their first and third round selections to the Edmonton Elks for Kyle Saxelid and Grant McDonald.

Preseason

Schedule 

 Games played with white uniforms.

Regular season

Season Standings

Season Schedule 

 Games played with colour uniforms.
 Games played with white uniforms.
 Games played with alternate uniforms.

Post-season

Schedule 

 Games played with white uniforms.

Team

Roster

Coaching staff

References

External links
 

Hamilton Tiger-Cats seasons
2022 in Ontario
2022 Canadian Football League season by team